A crowbar, also called a wrecking bar, pry bar or prybar, pinch-bar, or occasionally a prise bar or prisebar, colloquially, in Britain and Australia sometimes called a jemmy or jimmy (also called jemmy bar), gooseneck, or pig foot, is a lever consisting of a metal bar with a single curved end and flattened points, used to force two objects apart or gain mechanical advantage in lifting; often the curved end has a notch for removing nails.

The design can be used as any of the three lever classes. The curved end is usually used as a first-class lever, and the flat end as a second-class lever. 

Designs made from thick flat steel bar are often referred to as utility bars.

Materials and construction
A common hand tool, the crow bar is typically made of medium-carbon steel, possibly hardened on its ends.

Commonly crowbars are forged from long steel stock, either hexagonal or sometimes cylindrical. Alternative designs may be forged with a rounded I-shaped cross-section shaft. Versions using relatively wide flat steel bar are often referred to as "utility" or "flat bars".

Etymology and usage
The accepted etymology identifies the first component of the word crowbar with the bird-name "crow", perhaps due to the crowbar's resemblance to the feet or beak of a crow. The first use of the term is dated back to circa 1400. It was also called simply a crow, or iron crow; William Shakespeare used the latter, as in Romeo and Juliet, Act 5, Scene 2: "Get me an iron crow and bring it straight unto my cell."

In Daniel Defoe's 1719 novel Robinson Crusoe, the protagonist lacks a pickaxe so uses a crowbar instead: "As for the pickaxe, I made use of the iron crows, which were proper enough, though heavy."

Types
Types of crowbar include:
Alignment pry bar, also referred to as Sleeve bar
Cat’s claw pry bar, more simply known as a cat's paw 
Digging pry bar
Flat pry bar
Gooseneck pry bar
Heavy-duty pry bar
Molding pry bar
Rolling head pry bar

See also
 Halligan bar
 Kinetic energy penetrator
 Tire iron

References

Hand tools
Woodworking hand tools
Mechanical hand tools
Half-Life (series)